Aeacidae  refers to the Greek descendants of Aeacus, including Peleus, son of Aeacus, and Achilles, grandson of Aeacus—several times in the Iliad Homer refers to Achilles as Αἰακίδης (Aiakides: II.860, 874; IX.184, 191, etc.). Neoptolemus was the son of Achilles and the princess Deidamea. The kings of Epirus and Olympias, mother to Alexander the Great, claimed to be members of this lineage.

Aeacus of Greek mythology was the king of the island of Aegina, which is in the Saronic Gulf. From this mythology, Aeacus is the son of Zeus and Aegina, a daughter of Asopus and Metope. Aeacus' first wife was Endeïs, a woman of unknown parental lineage. They had two sons: Peleus (father of Achilles) and Telamon (father of Ajax). Aeacus' second wife was the Nereid, Psamathe. They had a son called Phocus.

Family tree of Aeacidae

References

Ancient Greek families
Epirotic mythology

Characters in Greek mythology